is an institution of higher learning in Nonoichi City, Ishikawa Prefecture, Japan.

It is known for its unique educational policy that attaches importance to initiative of students.

Programs

Undergraduate programs
College of Engineering (6 Departments)
College of Environmental Engineering and Architecture (5 Departments)
College of Informatics and Human Communication (4 Departments)

Graduate programs
Mechanical Engineering
Civil and Environmental Engineering
Information and Computer Engineering
Electrical Engineering and Electronics
System Design Engineering
Material Design Engineering
Architecture
Material Engineering
System for Intellectual Creation
Clinical Psychology

Educational institutions established in 1965
Research institutes in Japan
Technical universities and colleges in Japan
Engineering universities and colleges in Japan
Universities and colleges in Ishikawa Prefecture
American football in Japan
1965 establishments in Japan
Nonoichi, Ishikawa